is a Japanese bishōjo fighting game series developed by Fill-in-Cafe and published by FamilySoft. It is set in a school where members of school clubs fight each other in a fighting tournament. Originally released on the FM Towns home personal computer in 1994, it was released for multiple systems through the years. Masatoshi Imaizumi led development with artwork provided by manga artist Aoi Nanase and music by Keishi Yonao.

Plot
The game is set at the Ryōran Private School for Women, which educates the daughters of the upper echelons of society. Every year, the school's clubs hold a martial arts tournament called the "Club Rivalry Budget Contest Mega Fight" to compete for increased budget to the winning school club. After repeated poor performances at previous tournaments, the Chemistry Club president, Tetsuko Ōgigaya, scouts and trains Asuka Honda to become this year's winner. Asuka now has to defeat members of several school clubs in order to succeed.

Gameplay

The game is a 1v1 fighting game in the vein of Street Fighter II. However, in Asuka 120% each character employs a fighting style and techniques unique to each club as opposed to particular martial arts. The game has a standard input system for special moves across the entire cast which had not been seen in other fighting games at the time. Asuka 120% would switch from a 2-button to a 3-button game depending on the console it was released.

Also, unique to Asuka 120% is its "clash system". If both characters hit each other neither take damage; rather, they go into the next phase of the move until one character takes damage. During a clash, players can cancel into a special move, a movement option or a throw, which makes for explosive battles.

The "120%" portion of the game's name comes from the special meter gauge filling up at 120% instead of 100%. Once a full bar of meter is reached, it will begin draining slowly. During this state, characters have unlimited access to super meter.

All these systems, along with expanded mobility options compared to contemporary fighting games of that time, give Asuka 120% a flair of its own.

Characters

Introduced in Asuka 120% BURNING Fest.
 of the Chemistry Club

Asuka is a first year student and the titular character of the series. She is best friends with Karina Toyota and more recently, Kumi Ōkubo. Asuka was scouted and trained by the Chemistry Club president, Tetsuko Ougigaya, while still in middle school. Her main attacks involve volatile projectiles such as throwing chemical-filled beakers.

 of the Rhythmic Gymnastics Club

Kumi is a first year student who met Asuka during the Ryōran entrance exam and has been friends ever since. Kumi's attacks involve her rhythmic gymnast skills and props.

 of the Tennis Club

Tamaki is a third year student and reigning champion of the tournament. Loved by seniors and juniors alike, she works hard to uphold a good image since she is also the daughter of the school principal. Her moves involve the use of her tennis racket.

 of the Volleyball Club

Ryūko is a second year student. She is popular for her energy in sports, though schoolwork is another matter. Ryūko mainly uses volleyball tactics to attack her opponent, such as tackles and serves.

 of the Cheerleading Club

Megumi is a second year student who is popular in school but a lousy student. She fights using pom-pons and cheerleading routines.

 of the Karate Club

Torami is a third year student and runner-up from the previous year's tournament. A tomboyish yet popular girl, she returns to the tournament seeking a rematch against Tamaki. Torami fights using powerful karate moves.

Introduced in Asuka 120% Maxima BURNING Fest.
 of the Biology Club

Karina is the biology club representative and Asuka's best friend and self-proclaimed rival since childhood. A lot of her special moves involve her pet frog "Kero-pyon".

 of the Pro-Wrestling Club

Cathy is a third year exchange student from a sister school in Florida. Cheerful and sociable, she joins the tournament for fun. Her special moves involve pro-wrestling throws.

 of the Softball Club

Kiyoko is a second year student and the elected future student council president. She is a diligent yet cheerful girl. Her special moves involve a sharply thrown underhand pitch.

 of the Japanese Dance Club

Nana is a second year student and the eldest daughter of notable house Owada. She has a stoic and serious personality. Her special moves involve attacking with her folded fan and her naginata.

Introduced in Asuka 120% Special BURNING Fest.

Shinobu is a second year gang leader from Touyou Harimadana Institute. While traveling on a quest to defeat the strongest opponents from 100 different schools, she ran into Asuka who was her 100th opponent and the only one to beat her. She enters the tournament seeking a rematch against her.

Introduced in Asuka 120% Limited BURNING Fest.
 of the Chemistry Club

Tetsuko is a third year student and the Chemistry Club president. In order to stop losing the club tournament every year, she scouted Asuka while in middle school and subjected her to a year of arduous training. Hence, her special moves resemble Asuka's.

Genichirō is the school principal and a boss character in the earlier games.

Introduced in Asuka 120% Final BURNING Fest.
 of the Journalism Club

Ichiko is the journalism club representative who before Final serves as the game's narrator. Her special moves involve attacks with her microphone.

Development
Asuka 120% was produced by just two full-time programmers who comprised the company Fill-in-Cafe. The franchise was programmed and designed by Masatoshi Imaizumi, its music was composed by Keishi Yonao, and the games' illustrations were designed by Aoi Nanase.

Asuka 120% Burning Fest was just one fighting game of the era which had female characters, humor, and fan service. Similar games from that era include games such as Tōkidenshō Angel Eyes, Pretty Fighter X, and Variable Geo.

Categorized as a bishōjo game, eleven versions were released for various platforms between 1994 and 1999. The combat system of Asuka 120% was based on the beat-em-up Mad Stalker, and is also similar to Makeruna! Makendō 2: Kimero Youkai Souri. Development of Mad Stalker for the X68000, FM Towns and PlayStation (PCE CD port was co-developed by Kogado Studio); and the PlayStation port of Makeruna! Makendō 2: Kimero Youkai Souri (Super Famicom version was developed by Success), were done by Fill-in-Cafe.

Games

Reception

Japanese game magazine Famitsu reviewed several versions of the game. Maxima Burning Fest was given a score of 21 out of 40, Special Burning Fest was given a score of 23 out of 40, and Burning Fest Final was given a score of 28 out of 40.

Ted Thomas from Viz Media's online magazine wrote that Special BURNING Fest. is not worth importing.

GameSpot reviewed Excellent BURNING Fest. and gave it 7.1 in its review.

The game has been featured at fighting game tournaments, such as EVO Japan 2020. Additional to the games, Asuka 120% has had novels, soundtrack CDs, and other merchandise released during the 90s.

New Announcements
In March 25, 2021, a Japanese company called Opera House had announced two new entries in the Asuka 120% series on Twitter. The first was titled Asuka 120% Reborn, which is heavily based on the X68000 games set to release on the Mega Drive with a new character who was said to be a boxer girl, and new content. Additionally, Asuka 120% Reborn is also being planned for an enhanced release on the Nintendo Switch with an exclusive story mode. The second game was titled Asuka 120% O-Nyuu, which will feature the cast as 3D models for the first time and will be released on modern hardware.

See also
Phantom Breaker
Variable Geo

References

External links
 
Asuka 120% Final BURNING Fest. SuperLite 1500 version website 

Bishōjo games
Family Soft games
Fighting video games by series
Fill-in-Cafe games
High school-themed video games
Japan-exclusive video games
PlayStation (console) games
Cancelled Super Nintendo Entertainment System games
Success (company) games
Fighting games
Video games developed in Japan
Video games featuring female protagonists
Video game franchises
Video game franchises introduced in 1994
Video games scored by Keishi Yonao
Video games set in Japan